In mathematics, given a category C, a quotient of an object X by an equivalence relation  is a coequalizer for the pair of maps

The basic case in practice is when C is the category of all schemes over some scheme S. But the notion is flexible and one can also take C to be the category of sheaves.

Examples 
Let X be a set and consider some equivalence relation on it. Let Q be the set of all equivalence classes in X. Then the map  that sends an element x to the equivalence class to which x belongs is a quotient.
In the above example, Q is a subset of the power set H of X. In algebraic geometry, one might replace H by a Hilbert scheme or disjoint union of Hilbert schemes. In fact, Grothendieck constructed a relative Picard scheme of a flat projective scheme X as a quotient Q (of the scheme Z parametrizing relative effective divisors on X) that is a closed scheme of a Hilbert scheme H. The quotient map  can then be thought of as a relative version of the Abel map.

See also 
Categorical quotient, a special case

Notes

References 
Nitsure, N. Construction of Hilbert and Quot schemes. Fundamental algebraic geometry: Grothendieck’s FGA explained, Mathematical Surveys and Monographs 123, American Mathematical Society 2005, 105–137.

Binary relations
Scheme theory